Peter Putila is an American baseball executive. He is the general manager of the San Francisco Giants of Major League Baseball.

Career
Putila is a native of Carmichaels, Pennsylvania. He graduated from Carmichaels High School in 2007, after playing for the school's baseball team for four years. He enrolled at West Virginia University, where he was a student manager for the West Virginia Mountaineers baseball team and earned a degree in sport management.

In 2011, his senior year at West Virginia, Putila became an intern for the Houston Astros. General manager Ed Wade hired Putila for a fulltime position in the baseball operations department. In 2019, the Astros promoted Putila to assistant general manager.

After the 2022 season, the San Francisco Giants hired Putila as their general manager.

References

Living people
People from Greene County, Pennsylvania
West Virginia University alumni
Houston Astros executives
San Francisco Giants executives
Major League Baseball general managers
Year of birth missing (living people)